The Philippine Accrediting Association of Schools, Colleges and Universities (PAASCU) is a private, voluntary, non-profit and non-stock corporation which was registered with the Securities and Exchange Commission of the Philippines. It is a service organization which accredits academic programs which meet commonly accepted standards of quality education.

PAASCU is an accrediting body composed of different private educational institutions that stamp other private schools with a quality standard attained with regard to their programs.

History
PAASCU was established in November 5, 1957 as a private, voluntary, non-profit and non-stock corporation. The Bureau of Education and Culture (now Department of Education) formally endorsed PAASCU as an accrediting agency in November 1967.

In 1977 the Federation of Accrediting Agencies of the Philippines was established and one of its three founding members is PAASCU.

In 1991 the International Network for Quality Assurance Agencies in Higher Education (INQAAHE) was established and one of its founding members is the PAASCU. The INQAAHE is an international association of over 200 organizations that are active in theory and practice of quality assurance higher education.

PAASCU is also one of the founding member of the Asia-Pacific Quality Network (APQN). The APQN has been established with the purpose of satisfying the needs of quality assurance agencies in higher education.

Accredited Programs by PAASCU
These are the following programs that are accredited by PAASCU:

Standards 
PAASCU judges an institution not by comparison with other institutions but primarily by the degree to which each institution's own avowed purposes are matched by actual practice in the various areas being evaluated. Thus, a school is judged on the basis of the "total pattern" presented by it.

See also

 Educational accreditation
 Higher education in the Philippines
 List of universities and colleges in the Philippines
 Commission on Higher Education
 Professional Regulation Commission
 Federation of Accrediting Agencies of the Philippines

References

External links

School accreditors
Private education in the Philippines
Organizations established in 1957
1957 establishments in the Philippines